Blood, Sweat & No Tears is the third and final album by hip hop band Stetsasonic.

The CD version replaces the songs "To Whom It May Concern," "Corporate America," and "Do You Remember This?," which were included on the cassette version, with the new tracks "Gyrlz," "Your Mother Has Green Teeth," and "Took Place In East New York."

Critical reception
Trouser Press called Blood, Sweat & No Tears "an engaging state-of-the-art album seamlessly loaded with diverse music, thoughtful and/or amusing raps and more friendly family atmosphere than an Italian wedding." Entertainment Weekly wrote: "The music is pieced together well enough but still scattershot — solid if not innovative beats in one place, an L.L. Cool J-like ballad ('Walkin’ in the Rain') in another, a novelty throwaway or a stark beat somewhere else." The Baltimore Sun praised the "unmistakable ensemble groove."

Track listing

Charts

References

1991 albums
Stetsasonic albums
Tommy Boy Records albums
Albums produced by Prince Paul (producer)